Richard John Cheeseman Jr. (born November 24, 1966) is a United States Navy vice admiral and surface warfare officer who has served as the deputy chief of naval operations for manpower, personnel, training and education and 60th Chief of Naval Personnel since June 3, 2022. He previously served as a special assistant to the Commander, United States Fleet Forces Command, and prior to that was commander of Carrier Strike Group 10 from December 14, 2020 to April 6, 2022.

Raised in Carneys Point Township, New Jersey, Cheeseman earned a Bachelor of Science degree from Pennsylvania State University in 1989. He later received a master's degree in joint campaign planning and strategy from the Joint Advanced Warfighting School at the Joint Forces Staff College in 2007.

References

|-

|-

|-

|-

Date of birth missing (living people)
1966 births
Living people
People from Carneys Point Township, New Jersey
Pennsylvania State University alumni
Joint Forces Staff College alumni
United States Navy admirals
Military personnel from New Jersey